The International Wargames Federation (IWF) is the international body uniting  national wargaming federations of South Africa and was founded in 1991.

The IWF members are part of a greater movement toward integration of Mind Sports in the regular sports arena.

History

The International Wargames Federation was founded by the Derby Wargames Club and Mind Sports South Africa in 1991. It is the international controlling body for historical miniatures games other types of wargames and promotes all wargames on a worldwide level.

As a result of the International Wargames Federation being formed, members like Mind Sports South Africa have been allowed to affiliate with the South African Sports Confederation and Olympic Committee, and award officially accredited national colours to players who represent South Africa in official test matches and world championships.

World Championships

Today world 'championships' are played annually.

The World Championships have been played at the following locations:
 1997 - Old Edwardian Society, Johannesburg, South Africa
 1999 - The Castle, Cape Town, South Africa
 2000 - Epsom College, Epsom, United Kingdom
 2001 - Epsom College, Epsom, United Kingdom 
 2002 - Blue Waters Hotel, Durban, South Africa
 2003 - New Orleans, United States of America
 2004 - Rome, Italy
 2005 - University of Melbourne, Melbourne, Australia
 2006 - Gazzi, Athens, Greece
 2007 - Marine Hotel, Port Elizabeth, South Africa
 2008 - Helsinki, Finland
 2009 - Crown Plaza, Alexandria, USA
 2010 - Athens, Greece
 2011 - Wellington, new Zealand
 2012 - Blue Waters Hotel, Durban, South Africa
 2013 - Pretoria Boys High School, Pretoria, South Africa
 2014 - Hotel Victoria, Maseru, Lesotho
 2015 - Lugogo Sun, Mbabane, Swaziland

Games/periods played

The most popular competition periods for World Championships are:
 Ancients (3000Bc to 1500AD),
 Pike & Shot (1500AD to 1700AD), 
 World War II, 
 Morabaraba, and
 SesothoMorabaraba

World Champions

World Champions are:

ANCIENTS (DBM) - MALE

ANCIENTS (DBM) - FEMALE

ANCIENTS (DBM) - JUNIOR MALES

ANCIENTS (Field of Glory) - MALE

PIKE & SHOT - MALE

PIKE & SHOT - JUNIOR MALE

MORABARABA - SENIOR

MORABARABA - WOMEN

MORABARABA - JUNIOR

SESOTHOMORABARABA - MALE

Presidents, past and present 

Any organisation depends on the vision of the President. The term of office in the IWF, for such position is currently four years.

External links
 Mind Sports South Africa Homepage

Wargaming associations